The Fisher 25 or Fisher 25 MS (for motorsailer) is a British trailerable pilothouse sailboat that was designed by Wyatt and Freeman as a cruiser and first built in 1974.

Production
The design was previously built by Fairways Marine, Northshore Yachts and the Fisher Boat Company, all in the United Kingdom. Production started in 1974, 255 have been built and it remains in production by Fisher Yachts International.

Design
The Fisher 25 is a recreational keelboat, built predominantly of glassfibre, with wood trim. It has a masthead sloop or optional ketch rig, a raked stem, an angled transom, a transom-hung rudder controlled by a wheel in the pilot house and a tiller in the cockpit, and a fixed long keel. It displaces  and carries  of iron ballast.

The design has sleeping accommodation for five people, with a double "V"-berth in the bow cabin, an "L"-shaped settee with a drop-down table and a straight settee in the main cabin. The galley is located on the starboard side just forward of the companionway ladder. The galley is equipped with a two-burner stove and an ice box. The head is located just aft of the bow cabin on the port side.

Operational history
The boat is supported by an active class club, the Fisher Owners Association.

In a 2010 review Steve Henkel wrote, "Northshore Yacht Yards in Itchenor, Sussex, England, (a company that bought the former builder, Fairways Fisher) builds this chubby 25-foot motorsailer. The design is now over 30 years old, and in those years more than 250 have been built. Options include either a sloop or the ketch rig shown here. She can be steered from a tiller in the aft cockpit, or from inside, in the comfort of the pilot house. Best features: her pilot house will be welcome in cold, clammy environs, Worst features: The sail area, only 210 sq. ft. measured with 100 percent foretriangle, is tiny ... Consequently, don't count on the sails to move this boat in less than 10 knots of breeze. Sailing in sunny weather, there's poor visibility from the cockpit, and if it's hot, it would be nice if the pilot house were equipped with an air conditioner."

A 2009 review in Yachting Monthly reported, "to date 255 of these stout little ships have been built. Perfect for a couple wanting an easily handled, take-anything cruiser, her bluff bows contain a spacious, two-berth cabin. The saloon is roomy with a generous galley to starboard and a dinette opposite. A Quarterberth provides either a seaberth or guest accommodation. The wheelhouse has good headroom and contains the navigation station. The cockpit is also a reasonable size but visibility forward is restricted. In light conditions and to windward, the rig provides stability but little more. But off the wind in Force 4 she potters along happily."

See also
List of sailing boat types

References

External links

Photo of a Fisher 25 sailing
Photo of two Fisher 25s sailing, one with sloop rig and one with ketch rig

Keelboats
1970s sailboat type designs
Sailing yachts
Trailer sailers
Motorsailers
Sailboat type designs by Wyatt and Freeman
Sailboat types built by Fairways Marine
Sailboat types built by Northshore Yachts
Sailboat types built by Fisher Boat Company
Sailboat types built by Fisher Yachts International